Roark is an extinct town in Barry County, in the U.S. state of Missouri.

A post office called Roark was established in 1888, and remained in operation until 1911. The community bore the name of the local Roark family.

References

Ghost towns in Missouri
Former populated places in Barry County, Missouri